B. Gunar Gruenke is a stained glass artist in Wisconsin.

Early life 
Gruenke was born and raised in Wisconsin. He grew up surrounded by artists and craftsmen creating and conserving stained glass and decorating America's historic buildings and sacred spaces. He began studying art at the age of seven, under the tutelage of his grandfather, Bernard O. Gruenke, his father, Bernard E. Gruenke, both nationally recognized ecclesiastical artists, and other artists. He studied business administration at the University of Wisconsin-Whitewater, graduating with a major in general business.

Career 
Gruenke has made his life's work to carry on the tradition his father and grandfather have passed down. He is the third generation owner and president of the Conrad Schmitt Studios based in New Berlin, Wisconsin. Established in 1889, the architectural arts studio is one of Milwaukee's pioneer businesses. It is one of the businesses shown in the Milwaukee Public Museum "Streets of Old Milwaukee" exhibit. Gruenke oversees studio operations, including managing and supervising, restoration and renovation projects, and coordinating all phases of the craft associated with architectural arts and decorative interior schemes.

The studio's collection of stained glass artwork is on display at the Smith Museum of Stained Glass Windows at Navy Pier in Chicago. The art studio specializes in the investigation and documentation of original decorative schemes, gilding, glazing, marbleizing, scagliola and stenciling as well as the new design, replication or conservation of stained glass and murals.

Gruenke served as the president of the Stained Glass Association of America (SGAA) from June 2007 to June 2009; a director of the SGAA Stained Glass School; a director of the Western Great Lakes Chapter of the Association for Preservation Technology (APT), and as an APT International Board Member. His contributions to the field of stained glass have garnered the Distinguished Service Award 2010 from the Stained Glass Association of America for the studio's work compiling, editing and implementing the "SGAA Recommendations for Safety in the Stained Glass Studio.”

Gruenke Foundation for the Arts
Gruenke sits on the board of directors of the Gruenke Foundation for the Arts. This non-profit organization founded in 1996 is dedicated to arts education for the general public. The foundation' was established in 1991. It curates a collection of fine art that ranges from 1893 World's Trades Fair mosaics to a Giorgio Vasari painting from the early 16th century.

Projects 
Following is a partial list projects that Gruenke has supervised and managed:

 The Broadmoor resort, Colorado Springs, Colorado
 St. Mary's Cathedral, Colorado Springs, Colorado
 Warner Theatre - Lobby, Torrington, Connecticut
 Springer Opera House, Columbus, Georgia
 Hawaii Theatre, Honolulu, Hawaii
 Drake Hotel, Chicago, Illinois
 Roosevelt University – Ganz Hall, Chicago, Illinois
 St. Mary of the Angels Church, Chicago, Illinois
 Symphony Center - Orchestra Hall, Chicago, Illinois
 Paramount Theatre, Anderson, Indiana
 French Lick Springs Hotel, French Lick, Indiana
 St. Mary of the Immaculate Conception Cathedral, Lafayette, Indiana
 Basilica of the Sacred Heart, Notre Dame, Notre Dame, Indiana
 West Baden Springs Hotel, West Baden Springs, Indiana
 Union Passenger Terminal, New Orleans, Louisiana
 Citi Performing Arts Center - Wang Theatre, Boston, Massachusetts
 Colonial Theatre, Boston, Massachusetts
 Michigan Theatre, Ann Arbor, Michigan
 Temple Theatre, Saginaw, Michigan
 Gillioz Theatre, Springfield, Missouri
 St. Mary's Basilica, Natchez, Mississippi
 Federal Reserve Bank, Cleveland, Ohio
 Old Stone Church, Cleveland, Ohio
 East Broad Street Presbyterian Church, Columbus, Ohio
 Ohio Theatre, Columbus, Ohio
 Philadelphia City Hall, Philadelphia, Pennsylvania
 Sovereign Center - Rajah Theatre, Reading, Pennsylvania
 St. Mary's Catholic Church, Salem, South Dakota
 Paramount Theatre, Charlottesville, Virginia
 Mosque Theatre, Richmond, Virginia
 Al. Ringling Theatre, Baraboo, Wisconsin
 Brown County Courthouse, Green Bay, Wisconsin
 Miller Brewing Company, Milwaukee, Wisconsin

Works 
 “Beauty Restored to Historic Church: Saint Francis Xavier in Vincennes – the Oldest Parish in the Indiana Territory”. Adoremus Bulletin, vol. XV, no. 3.
 “Choosing Wisely Among Stained Glass Restoration Methods”. Church Executive Magazine, December, 2002.
 "Safety" in The Stained Glass Handbook, 2006.
 “Seabees Construct Stained Glass Windows in Iraq”. Stained Glass Quarterly, Winter, 2006.
 “Selecting a Stained Glass Style”.  Religious Product News, October, 2007.
 “Metallic Wall Coatings”. PaintPro Magazine, November/December, 2007.
 “Scagliola: Beautiful Faker”. PWC: Painting and Wallcovering Contractor, November/December, 2007.
 “Midwestern Masterpiece”. Journal of Architectural Coatings, May, 2008.
 “Protecting your Decorative Investment”. Religious Product News, January, 2009.
 “Protecting your Church Treasures: If something happens to your Treasures, could they be replaced?”. Church & Worship Technology, February, 2009.
 “Objets d’Art: Insuring and Restoring Treasures Can Be Tricky”. Claims Magazine, July, 2009.

References

External links
Gruenke Foundation for the Arts
Official website at navypier.com
Article on SGAA Distinguished Service Award 2010

People from Waukesha County, Wisconsin
American stained glass artists and manufacturers
Year of birth missing (living people)
Living people